Xavier Pelegrí Durán (born 1 June 1981) is a Spanish retired footballer who played as a central defender.

Club career
Born in Barcelona, Catalonia, Pelegrí made his senior debut with Real Valladolid's reserves in Tercera División. He first arrived in Segunda División B in the summer of 2002, joining CP Cacereño after a short stint at UE Cornellà.

In July 2003, Pelegrí moved to UE Lleida also in the third level. He appeared in 27 games in his first season, helping his team promote to Segunda División after a three-year absence.

Pelegrí played his first match as a professional on 5 September 2004, coming on as a late substitute in a 2–0 away win against Cádiz CF. He contributed with 20 appearances in the 2005–06 campaign, which finished in relegation. 

Pelegrí subsequently resumed his career in the third and fourth levels, representing Orihuela CF, Águilas CF, CE Sabadell FC, UE Sant Andreu, CF Badalona and Cornellà. He achieved promotion to division three with the latter club in 2014, featuring in 23 matches and scoring twice.

References

External links

1981 births
Living people
Footballers from Barcelona
Spanish footballers
Association football defenders
Segunda División players
Segunda División B players
Tercera División players
CF Damm players
Real Valladolid Promesas players
UE Cornellà players
CP Cacereño players
UE Lleida players
Orihuela CF players
CE Sabadell FC footballers
UE Sant Andreu footballers
CF Badalona players